The 2008 United States Senate election in Arkansas was held on November 4, 2008. Incumbent Democratic U.S. Senator Mark Pryor ran for a second term. No Republican filed to challenge him, and his only opponent was Green Party candidate Rebekah Kennedy. Pryor won re-election with almost 80% of the vote, despite Republican John McCain winning the state by nearly 20 points in the concurrent presidential election.

Kennedy received the highest ever vote share of any Green Party candidate running for U.S. Senate, and the highest for a third party Senate candidate in Arkansas until her record was surpassed by Libertarian candidate Ricky Dale Harrington Jr. in 2020.

, this was the last time the Democrats won a U.S. Senate election in Arkansas.

Candidates

Democratic 
 Mark Pryor, incumbent U.S. Senator

Green 
 Rebekah Kennedy, attorney and nominee for Attorney General in 2006 and 2010

General election

Campaign 
On March 10, the state Republican Party announced it has no plans to field a candidate against Pryor.  The only Republican to express interest in the race, health care executive Tom Formicola, decided not to run the weekend before filing began.  Formicola lost the GOP primaries for the Senate in 2004 and the United States House of Representatives in 2006. As a result, Pryor was the only Senator in 2008 to face no major-party opposition in a reelection bid.

There had been speculation that former Governor Mike Huckabee would run against Pryor if his presidential bid were unsuccessful, but on March 8, Huckabee said he would not contest the race.

Pryor's sole challenger was Green Party nominee Rebekah Kennedy, who entered the race in April 2007. Kennedy received 206,504 votes (20.54%). This is the highest percentage of the vote for any Green Party candidate running for U.S. Senate ever, and her 206,504 votes is the second most total votes received by a Green Party candidate for U.S. Senate after Medea Susan Benjamin's 326,828 votes in the 2000 California Senate race. Kennedy's campaign, in addition to being record breaking for the Green Party, was also the strongest showing of any independent or third party candidate running for the U.S. Senate in 2008.

Predictions

Polling 
Pryor was polled at 90% in a poll without a challenger in March.

Results

See also 
 2008 United States Senate elections
 2002 United States Senate election in Arkansas

References

External links 
 Elections from the Arkansas Secretary of State
 U.S. Congress candidates for Arkansas at Project Vote Smart
 Arkansas, U.S. Senate from CQ Politics
 Arkansas U.S. Senate from OurCampaigns.com
 Arkansas U.S. Senate race from 2008 Race Tracker
 Campaign contributions from OpenSecrets
 official campaign websites (Archived)
 Rebekah Kennedy, Green Party candidate
 Mark Pryor, Democratic incumbent

2008
Arkansas
United States Senate